European route E 762 is a road part of the International E-road network. It begins in Sarajevo, Bosnia and Herzegovina, and officially ends at the border between Montenegro and Albania. In Albania, road signs indicate the route heading towards Montenegro but not heading toward Shkodër.

Route 
 
 M-18  Sarajevo
 Foča
 
 : Šćepan Polje - Podgorica
 : Podgorica
 : Podgorica - Božaj

External links 
 UN Economic Commission for Europe: Overall Map of E-road Network (2007)
 International E-road network

799762
E762
E762
E762